Jacques Anouma (born 11 December 1951) is a football administrator and a former member of the FIFA Executive Committee.

References

1951 births
FIFA officials
Living people